Lazare is a given name and a surname. 

Lazare may also refer to:

 Lazare (Bruneau), a 1903 opera by Alfred Bruneau
 a late work (1974) by André Malraux (1901–1976), which dealt with one of his last illnesses
 a song by the Polish folk-metal band Percival

See also
 Saint-Lazare (disambiguation)
 Lazar (disambiguation)